Malcolm Rogers may refer to:

Malcolm Rogers (actor), British television actor in For the Love of Ada etc.
Malcolm Jennings Rogers, archaeologist
Malcolm Rogers (curator), director of the Museum of Fine Arts, Boston